Tau Sigma is an honor society for university transfer students.

Tau Sigma was established in 1999 at Auburn University. Part of the impetus for the creation of the organization was to provide a social support network to transfer students.

Specific membership criteria are established by individual chapters, however, in general a student must have transferred from one university to another university with one year worth of academic credits already earned a 3.5 or better grade point average during the first term of enrollment at their new institution.

In addition to chapter-specific activities, the Tau Sigma national organization awards academic scholarships to Tau Sigma members. In 2013 it provided 105 scholarships totaling $36,500 in value. According to the organization, it had approximately 100 chapters in the United States as of 2014.

References

Honor societies
Student organizations established in 1999
1999 establishments in Alabama